Fly Me Courageous is the fourth studio album by the hard rock/Southern rock band Drivin' N' Cryin', released on January 8, 1991, by Island Records. The album is the band's most commercially successful release, in part due to the title track striking a patriotic chord in the United States during the start of the Persian Gulf War. In 1995, Fly Me Courageous was certified gold.

Overview
Originally, Andy Johns was slotted to produce the album, as the band was impressed by his work with Rod Stewart and Cinderella. However, Johns fell ill, so they chose Geoff Workman to produce instead.

Fly Me Courageous was released during the outbreak of the Persian Gulf War. In turn, the album's title track was interpreted as a pro-war song. "Fly Me Courageous" reached #15 on the Modern Rock Tracks chart. Drivin' N Cryin's guitarist Kevn Kinney said of the song's success:

In addition to the title track, "Build a Fire" enjoyed some commercial success, reaching #15 on the Mainstream Rock Tracks chart and receiving regular rotation on MTV.

Reception

Tom Demalon of AllMusic called Fly Me Courageous Drivin' N Cryin's "finest moment, both commercially and artistically." Entertainment Weekly'''s Bob Mack wrote of the album: "Stabs at pop ('Together') and last-ditch efforts to dazzle ('Rush Hour') are too little, too late, but even so, their impulse to integrate influences rather than pick a niche is refreshing". Both reviewers also noted the influence of R.E.M. on the album's sound (Drivin' N Cryin' had toured with R.E.M. during R.E.M.'s Green tour).

Track listing

Personnel
The following people contributed to Fly Me Courageous:Drivin' N Cryin'
 Buren Fowler – guitar
 Kevn Kinney – guitar, vocals
 Tim Nielsen – bass guitar, mandolin, backing vocals
 Jeff Sullivan – drums, percussion

Additional personnel
 George Marino – mastering
 Tim "Super Glue" Ray – assistant engineering
 Geoff Workman – engineering, production

Charts
Album

Singles

See alsoMacDougal Blues'', a 1990 Kevn Kinney solo album that features members of Drivin' 'n Cryin'

References

External links
 Fly Me Courageous page on Drivin' N Cryin's official website

1991 albums
Island Records albums
Drivin N Cryin albums
Albums produced by Geoff Workman